Sóknardalr is the debut studio album by Norwegian black metal band Windir. It was released in April 1997 through the Head Not Found record label.

Background 
Sóknardalr is the old Norse name of Valfar's hometown Sogndal. The lyrics are written in the Sogndal dialect, and the song titles in Nynorsk, the official written form of Sogndal municipality.

Musical style 
AllMusic described the album as "[fusing] layers upon layers of keyboards and guitars on an almost unprecedented scale (mid-period Bathory being the one obvious inspirational touchstone), culminating in sweeping, mini-symphonies", featuring "synthesizer melodies [that] would become signature Windir hallmarks."

Critical reception 

AllMusic wrote, "In an almost singular case study within the annals of Scandinavian black metal, where groups require several years and albums in which to experiment, develop and mature their sound, Sóknardalr saw Windir springing fully formed like Athena from the head of Zeus".

Track listing

Personnel
Valfar - vocals, all instruments, producer, mixing, photography

Additional personnel
Steingrim - drums
Steinarson - clean vocals
Krohg - mixing, logo, artwork
J. E. Bjork - mastering, graphic design

References 

Windir albums
1997 albums